Jack Lenard Freeman (January 20, 1922 – July 23, 1990) was an American football guard for the Brooklyn Dodgers of the AAFC. He played college football at Texas.

College football career 
Freeman played football for the Texas Longhorns from 1938 to 1942. He was inducted into the Texas Longhorn Hall of Honor, which he helped organize, in 1989.

Professional football career

Philadelphia-Pittsburgh Steagles 
Freeman was drafted in the 27th round of the 1943 NFL Draft by the Pittsburgh Steelers, who would later temporarily merge with the Philadelphia Eagles to form the Philadelphia-Pittsburgh Steagles for the 1943 NFL season.

However, Freeman did not play with the Steagles in 1943, as he was completing his Army Air Corps training at Randolph Air Base in San Antonio, Texas. He instead played football for two years at Randolph, and for one year at Fort Worth Army Air Base.

Brooklyn Dodgers 
In 1946, Freeman moved to New York to play for the Brooklyn Dodgers of the All-America Football Conference. He played twelve games with the Dodgers, starting three of them.

Personal life 
Freeman and his wife Daisy, who he met while at the University of Texas, eloped in January 1943.

He died on July 23, 1990, at the age of 68.

References 

1922 births
1990 deaths
American football guards
Brooklyn Dodgers (AAFC) players
Steagles players and personnel
Texas Longhorns football players
Players of American football from Texas
People from Mexia, Texas